Prucnal is a surname. Notable people with the surname include: 

Anna Prucnal (born 1940), Polish actress
Paul Prucnal (born 1953), American electrical engineer